The Champions Cup (branded as the KIOTI Tractor Champions Cup for sponsorship reasons) is a Canadian curling tournament. Part of the Grand Slam of Curling (GSoC) and the World Curling Tour, it is the sixth GSoC event on the women's tour and the seventh on the men's tour. 

The tournament's field usually includes 15 teams each in the men's and women's competitions. 13 of the spots are filled by champion teams from GSoC events, and world, national, and regional champions, The champions of two World Curling Tour events, based on the strength of field, are also invited. If a team qualifies from more than one event or declines the invitation, champions of World Curling Tour events with the highest strength of field are invited until the field of 15 teams is completed.

Due to the COVID-19 pandemic, the 2021 Champions Cup format was altered to consist of top 12 teams according to the World Curling Federation’s world curling team rankings, divided into two pools.

Past champions

Men

Women

References

 
Men's Grand Slam (curling) events
Women's Grand Slam (curling) events
Annual sporting events in Canada